ANL may refer to:
American Negro League, one of the several Negro leagues that were established during the early twentieth century in the United States when professional baseball was segregated
Andulo Airport, an Angolan airport with this IATA code
Anguilla, UNDP country code
Anniesland railway station, from its United Kingdom rail code
Anti-Nazi League, an anti-fascist campaign in the United Kingdom
Anti-Nowhere League, an English punk band
Argonne National Laboratory, one of the United States Department of Energy National Laboratories
Australian National Line, an Australian government-owned shipping company
Australian Netball League, a second-tier netball competition in Australia